Streamlabs (formerly TwitchAlerts) is a California-based software company founded in 2014. The company primarily distributes livestreaming software. Streamlabs produces the video streaming software Streamlabs Desktop, as well as CrossClip, a video converter; Melon, a podcast streaming service; Oslo, a video editing tool, and Willow; a website builder.

Streamlabs was acquired by Logitech in 2019.

History 
Streamlabs was founded in 2014 as TwitchAlerts, an Open Broadcaster Software (OBS Studio)-based tool that allowed livestreamers to add on-screen visual alerts, triggered by viewer interactions such as new followers, subscribers, and donations. TwitchAlerts had no official affiliation with Twitch, and was later renamed to Streamlabs in 2016.

Logitech purchased the company for $89 million on September 26, 2019.

Criticism
On November 16, 2021, Streamlabs released 'Streamlabs Studio', a cloud capture software for the Xbox One, Xbox Series S, and the Xbox Series X. After the release, the streaming service Lightstream accused Streamlabs of plagiarizing their promotional materials. Later that same day, the OBS Studio team claimed in a tweet that Streamlabs used the name "OBS" in their products despite OBS Studio already denying Streamlabs permission to use the name, giving the false appearance of being in partnership with OBS Studio. 

OBS Studio's tweet resulted in Twitch streamers, including Pokimane and Hasan Piker, threatening a boycott of their product if changes were not made. Other companies, such as Elgato and 1UpCoin, have also spoken up on Twitter about Streamlabs copying their products. The company subsequently removed the name "OBS" from their products.

Products 
Streamlabs Desktop (formerly Streamlabs OBS) is a free and open-source streaming software that is based on a fork of OBS Studio. Electron is used as the software framework for the user interface. Streamlabs distributes the user's content over platforms such as Twitch, YouTube Live, and Facebook Live.

Crossclip is a video converter website that allows users to convert, edit and share live streaming content across multiple platforms.

Willow is a link-in-bio link tool that is meant to help users increase revenue and make their links more discoverable. It includes a tipping feature and allows users to tip directly on the page.

Melon is a browser-based podcast live streaming platform. Users can broadcast their live streams to Twitch, YouTube, Facebook, Linkedin, or a custom RTMP destination.

Oslo is a video review and collaboration tool. Users can upload and share projects in the cloud, and Oslo's project management and annotation tools provide ways for teams to receive and review feedback, as well as upload videos to YouTube.

Streamlabs Charity is a free fundraising platform that assists charities in raising funds and connecting with streamers. Excluding standard processing fees, the platform takes no cut from donations, allowing everything to go to charity.

See also 

 VLC
 YouTube
 Zoom

References

External links
 

2019 mergers and acquisitions
C++ software
Cross-platform free software
Free and open-source software
Free software programmed in C++
Livestreaming software
Logitech products
Screencasting software
Software that uses FFmpeg
Software that uses Qt
Streaming software
Technology companies established in 2014
Video recording software
Windows software